The Fasti Capitolini, or Capitoline Fasti, are a list of the chief magistrates of the Roman Republic, extending from the early fifth century BC down to the reign of Augustus, the first Roman emperor.  Together with similar lists found at Rome and elsewhere, they form part of a chronology referred to as the Fasti Annales, Fasti Consulares, or Consular Fasti, or occasionally just the fasti.

The Capitoline Fasti were originally engraved on marble tablets erected in the Roman forum.  The main portions were discovered in a fragmentary condition, and removed from the forum in 1546, as ancient structures were dismantled to produce material for the construction of St. Peter's Basilica.  They were brought to the Palazzo dei Conservatori on the adjacent Capitoline Hill, where they remain as part of the collection of the Capitoline Museums, together with other Roman antiquities.  Together with the histories of writers such as Livy and Dionysius of Halicarnassus, the Capitoline Fasti form one of the primary sources for Roman chronology.

History
The term fasti originally referred to calendars published by the pontifices, indicating the days on which business could be transacted (fasti) and those on which it was prohibited for religious reasons (nefasti).  These calendars frequently included lists of the annual magistrates.  In many ancient cultures, the most common way to refer to individual years was by the names of the presiding magistrates.  The annually-elected consuls were the eponymous magistrates at Rome, and so lists of the consuls going back many years were useful for dating historical events.  Over time such lists also became known as fasti.

The Capitoline Fasti are thought to have been engraved in one of two places: first, the wall of the Regia, originally the residence or official seat of the Roman kings, and later the official residence of the Pontifex Maximus, the chief priest of Rome, between 36 and 30 BC.  The Annales Maximi, records of Roman history from the earliest period to the late second century BC, and one of the sources consulted by ancient historians, were stored in the Regia.  Alternatively, the Fasti Capitolini may have been inscribed on the Arch of Augustus, in 18 BC.  In either case, they were subsequently continued down to the death of Augustus in AD 14.

In 1540, Pope Paul III authorized the recycling of stone from the forum for the construction of St. Peter's Basilica.  The structures in the part of the forum where the fasti were discovered were dismantled between August 15 and September 14, 1546.  Some of the stone was sold to stonecutters to be reused in the construction, while some was sold to lime burners to be used for cement.  The work was carried out by a company of local quarrymen, with little regard for the archaeological value of the ancient structures, but the scholars Onofrio Panvinio and Pirro Ligorio observed the demolition, and noticed a portion of the fasti still embedded between pilasters in a wall.  Other portions were found scattered nearby, and the scholars rescued them, ordering further tunnels dug in order to search for more fragments.  Some were found embedded in nearby buildings, indicating that stone from the same area had previously been reused.

Thirty fragments of the Fasti Capitolini were recovered, along with twenty-six fragments of the Acta Triumphalia, or Fasti Triumphales, dating to the same period and recording the names of Roman generals who had been honoured with a triumph.  Cardinal Alessandro Farnese brought them to the Palazzo dei Conservatori on the nearby Capitoline Hill, where Ligorio and Michelangelo reconstructed them, based on the observations of Panvinio and Ligorio.  Two additional fragments were discovered during excavations in the forum in 1817 and 1818.  Others were discovered in excavations from 1872 to 1878, with the last discovered in the Tiber in 1888.

Today, the Palazzo forms part of the Capitoline Museums, and the Capitoline Fasti are housed in the Sala della Lupa, the Salon of the Wolf, together with the Capitoline Wolf, for which the gallery is named.

Contents

Due to the fragmentary condition of the Fasti Capitolini, it is not entirely certain whether they began with the first year of the Republic, or with the kings, as did the related Fasti Triumphales.  The first year which is partially extant is 483 BC.  The last surviving year is AD 13, and the fasti probably ended the following year.  The extant years include the names of the consuls, who gave their names to each year, as well as consuls suffecti, who replaced those who resigned or died during their year of office.  The fasti also include the dictators and magistri equitum for the years in which they were appointed, as well as the censors, together with the decemvirs and consular tribunes for the years in which they were elected in place of consuls.

The original form of the fasti is thought to have consisted of four large tablets, each of which was several feet high.  The first ran to 390 BC, the second to 293, the third to 154, and the fourth to 9 BC, with the remaining years to AD 14 in the margin.  The fasti include a number of notes, indicating when the office-holders mentioned resigned, died, or were killed during their years of office; and they provide additional information, such as the years in which important wars began, the reasons for the nomination of dictators, the number of the lustrum taken by the censors, and the number of years since the founding of Rome, according to the era of Cato, given every ten years.  Cato placed the founding of Rome one year later than Varro, so the years given in the fasti appear later than the dates given in the columns on the left.

The Capitoline Fasti were first transcribed and published by Marliani at Rome in 1549, Sigonius at Modena in 1550, and Robortelli at Venice in 1555.  Early publications were heavily edited to give the appearance of completeness.  The current reconstruction is part of the Corpus Inscriptionum Latinarum, appearing in the first volume, and since amended several times.

Historical accuracy
Although some scholars have questioned the accuracy of the Capitoline Fasti, particularly with regard to the earliest portion, the overall chronology is remarkably consistent from one source to the next, and all of the Roman historians and annalists place the beginning of the Republic within a span of about seven or eight years.  The Fasti Capitolini represent the longest version of the chronology, and current scholarly opinion accepts nearly all of the list, with two main exceptions: the so-called "dictator years", four years during the latter part of the fourth century BC, in which the dictators of the preceding years are said to have continued in office without the election of consuls; and also a span of time leading up to the passage of the lex Licinia Sextia in 367 BC, during which the tribunes of the plebs are said to have prevented the election of annual magistrates for five years, in order to force the passage of the law.

The four "dictator years" are generally regarded as a late interpolation, as such a remarkable departure from the Roman constitution, which normally limited the term of a dictator to six months, is not mentioned by any of the Roman historians, nor are the "dictator years" found in any source other than the Capitoline Fasti.  The so-called "anarchy" earlier in the fourth century is less easily explained, since the story of this period is corroborated in multiple accounts, including Livy and Diodorus Siculus, but the length of time that Rome was without annual magistrates may have been exaggerated; perhaps only one year, as stated by Diodorus.

Transcription
The following tables give the magistrates and events from the most recent reconstruction of the Fasti Capitolini.  The years supplied are based on the Varronian chronology; years AUC given in the original table are provided under "notes".  Portions of names and text in square brackets have been interpolated.  Periods (full stops) have been supplied for abbreviations.  An em dash is used for missing or unknown filiations or other abbreviated praenomina.  Other missing text is indicated with an ellipsis in brackets, [...].  These tables uses modern conventions for distinguishing between I and J, and between U and V.  Otherwise, the names and notes are given as spelled in the fasti.  Archaic Roman spellings, such as Aimilius for Aemilius, and caussa for causa, have been preserved.  A list of Latin phrases and abbreviations appearing below follows the last table.

Magistracies
 Censs. = censores, censors
 Coss. = consules, consuls
 Dict. = dictator
 Imp. = imperator, emperor
 Mag. Eq. = magister equitum
 Tribuni Militum cos. pot. = tribuni militum consulari potestate, military tribunes with consular powers, or "consular tribunes"
 IIIvir = triumvir rei publicae constituendae, triumvir to restore the Republic

Fifth century BC

Fourth century BC

Third century BC

Second century BC

First century BC

First century AD

Formulas and abbreviations
 abdicarunt ut decemviri consulari imperio fierent = abdicated for the appointment of decemvirs with consular imperium
 abdicavit (abd.) = he resigned, abdicated
 ambo primi de plebe = the first time both were from the plebeians
 Bellum Antiochinum = War with Antiochus
 Bellum Gallicum cisalpinum = War with the Cisalpine Gauls
 Bellum Marsicum = Marsic or Social War
 Bellum Persicum = War with Perseus (Third Macedonian War)
 Bellum Philippicum = War with Philip (Second Macedonian War)
 Bellum Punicum primum/secundum/tertium = First/Second/Third Punic War
 clavi figendi causa = to drive a nail into the wall of the temple of Jupiter Optimus Maximus on the Capitol, a sacred rite invoked in times of emergency
 comitiorum habendorum causa = to call the comitia, usually for the election of new magistrates.
 decemviri consulari imperio legibus scribundis facti eodem anno = decemvirs with consular imperium to record the laws were appointed (elected) the same year
 hoc anno dictator et magister equitum sine consulibus fuerunt = this year the dictator and magister equitum [continued] without consuls.
 in eius locum factus est (in loc. f. e.) = in his place was chosen (elected, appointed)
 in magistratu damnatus est (in mag. damn. e.) = he was condemned in [his] magistracy
 in magistratu mortuus est (in mag. mort. e., in m. m. e.) = he died in [his] magistracy
 in magistratu occisus est (in mag. occ. e.) = he was slain in [his] magistracy
 in proelio occisus est = he was slain in the war
 interregni causa = due to the interregnum
 Latinarum feriarum causa = to hold the Latin festival
 lustrum fecerunt (l. f.) [numeral] = the x th lustrum (the census) was made (held, taken)
 postea quam dictatura/censura abiit = after leaving the dictatorship/censorship
 primus e plebe = the first from among the plebeians
 quaestionum exercendarum causa = to pursue an investigation
 qui (in hoc honore) postea [name] appellatus est = who (in his honour) was afterward called [name]
 qui scriba fuerat = who had been a scribe
 rei gerundae causa (r. g. c.) = to perform a task, usually a military command
 rei publicae constituendae causa = to reform the constitution of the Republic
 seditionis sedandae = to quell sedition
 senatus legendi causa = to fill up the roll of the senate
 sine collega = without a colleague
 sine magister equitum = without a magister equitum
 solus consulatum gessit = the sole consul elected
 tribunicia potestate = holding the tribunician power (the power to veto or forbid an action of the magistrates)
 vitio facti abdicarunt = they resigned due to a vitium, a fault in the auspices

See also
 List of Roman consuls
 List of Roman dictators

References

Bibliography
 Marcus Tullius Cicero, De Oratore.
 Diodorus Siculus, Bibliotheca Historica (Library of History).
 Titus Livius (Livy), History of Rome.
 Theodor Mommsen et alii, Corpus Inscriptionum Latinarum (The Body of Latin Inscriptions, abbreviated CIL), Berlin-Brandenburgische Akademie der Wissenschaften (1853–present).
 Dictionary of Greek and Roman Antiquities, William Smith, ed., Little, Brown, and Company, Boston (1859).
 René Cagnat et alii, L'Année épigraphique (The Year in Epigraphy, abbreviated AE), Presses Universitaires de France (1888–present).
 James Chidester Egbert, Introduction to the Study of Latin Inscriptions, American Book Company, New York (1895).
 Harper's Dictionary of Classical Literature and Antiquities, Harry Thurston Peck, ed. (Second Edition, 1897).
 Rodolfo Lanciani, New Tales of Old Rome, Macmillan & Company, London (1901).
 John Sandys, Latin Epigraphy: an Introduction to the Study of Latin Inscriptions, University of Chicago Press (1927).
 T. Robert S. Broughton, The Magistrates of the Roman Republic, American Philological Association (1952–1986).
 Oxford Classical Dictionary, N. G. L. Hammond and H. H. Scullard, eds., Clarendon Press, Oxford (Second Edition, 1970).
 Timothy J. Cornell, The Beginnings of Rome: Italy and Rome from the Bronze Age to the Punic Wars (c. 1000–264 BC), Routledge, London (1995).

 
 
 
 
Lists of office-holders in ancient Rome
Ancient timelines
Roman calendar
Latin inscriptions
1st-century inscriptions